Paracalyx is a genus of legume in the family Fabaceae. 
It contains the following species:
 Paracalyx balfourii
 Paracalyx scariosa

References 

Phaseoleae
Taxonomy articles created by Polbot
Fabaceae genera